Fabio Liverani (born 29 April 1976) is an Italian football manager and former midfielder, who was most recently in charge of Cagliari.

He made 288 Serie A appearances across 12 seasons, representing Perugia, Lazio, Fiorentina and Palermo. He was the first black player for the Italy national team, playing three matches from 2001 to 2006.

In 2013, Liverani began his managerial career with a brief spell at top-flight club Genoa. He also managed English club Leyton Orient and Serie B club Ternana before taking Lecce to two consecutive promotions to the top flight.

Club career

Liverani was born in Rome, Italy to a Somali mother and an Italian father. He made his professional footballing debut with Viterbese of Serie C2 in 1996–97. He transferred to Perugia in the 2000–01 season. From 2001 to 2006, Liverani played for Lazio in Italy's Serie A. He was part of their team that won the Coppa Italia in 2004, defeating Juventus 4–2 on aggregate.

The 2006 season saw Liverani move to Fiorentina. He played a total of two seasons with the team, including the Viola team's 2007–08 Serie A campaign, which ended with Fiorentina securing fourth place and a spot in the third qualifying round of the UEFA Champions League 2008-09. Fiorentina and Liverani parted company the following season.

In May 2008, Liverani signed a three-year contract with Palermo, being also appointed team captain. Liverani was forced to miss the first three months of the 2009–10 season due to a serious injury that he had sustained on May, and broke back into the first team only on November, then being replaced as permanent team captain by Fabrizio Miccoli. In his first game as a regular, against Chievo, the first game of new head coach Delio Rossi in charge of the team, Liverani went on to be sent off during the game.

On 30 August 2011, he moved to Lugano, signing a two-year contract. Liverani never played for the Swiss, and rescinded his contract by mutual consent later on November.

International career
On 25 April 2001, Liverani became the first black Italian footballer to play internationally with the Italy national team, making his debut with the Azzurri in a friendly match against South Africa in Perugia, under the management of Giovanni Trapattoni; the match ended in a 1–0 victory for the Italians.

On 16 August 2006, he was again summoned to start for the Italy national team in a friendly in Livorno against Croatia by the team's new coach, Roberto Donadoni; the match ended in a 2–0 loss. In total he made three appearances for Italy.

Style of play
In spite of his lack of pace, agility, stamina, or defensive skills, Liverani was a highly creative, reliable, and quick-thinking player, who was known in particular for his technique, vision, range of distribution, and precise passing with his left foot, which enabled him to create chances for teammates, and made him an excellent assist provider. Due to his skills and ability to set the tempo of his team's play in midfield, he usually operated in the centre or in front of the back-line, where he functioned as a deep-lying playmaker in midfield. In addition to his playmaking abilities as a footballer, he also stood out for his mentality and leadership, both on and off the pitch.

Managerial career
Genoa
Following his retirement, Liverani was offered a position as youth coach at Genoa, in charge of the Allievi Regionali B squad, which he accepted on 15 November 2011.

On 7 June 2013, Genoa president Enrico Preziosi announced the appointment of Liverani as new first team manager in place of Davide Ballardini. He was sacked on 29 September after one win in his seven Serie A games in charge, and replaced by Gian Piero Gasperini.

Leyton Orient
On 8 December 2014, Liverani was appointed as manager of English League One team, Leyton Orient on a -year contract replacing Mauro Milanese who returned to his role as Sporting Director after 8 matches in charge. Following their relegation to League Two, Liverani left the club by mutual consent in May 2015.

Ternana
On 6 March 2017, Liverani was appointed as manager of Serie B team, Ternana Calcio replacing Carmine Gautieri who was sacked after gaining only 3 points in 7 matches. Ternana was last with only 23 points in 29 matches, but he gained 26 points in 13 games to avoid direct relegation as well as play-outs. At the end of the season, with the club under new ownership, Liverani's contract was not renewed.

Lecce
On 17 September 2017, Liverani was appointed manager of Lecce, with whom he achieved two direct promotions from Serie C to Serie A, thus bringing the Salento club back to the Italian top-tier league after seven years. Lecce made it to the last day of the 2019–20 season before being relegated with a 4–3 home loss to Parma. On 19 August 2020, Liverani was sacked.

Parma
On 28 August 2020, Liverani was appointed manager of Parma on a two-year contract, after the dismissal of Roberto D'Aversa. On 7 January 2021, after four straight losses, Liverani was sacked.

Cagliari
On 8 June 2022, Liverani was unveiled as the new head coach of Cagliari, following the club's relegation to Serie B.

On 20 December 2022, following a 1–2 loss at Palermo and a disappointing first half of the season with Cagliari in fourteenth place in the league table, Liverani was dismissed from his coaching duties.

Managerial statistics

HonoursLazio'
Coppa Italia: 2003–04

References

External links
 Sky Sports | Football | Serie A | Palermo | Fabio Liverani
 

1976 births
Living people
Italian footballers
Italian expatriate footballers
Italian people of Somali descent
Italian sportspeople of African descent
Italy international footballers
Footballers from Rome
Serie A players
Serie C players
Swiss Challenge League players
A.C. Perugia Calcio players
Cagliari Calcio players
S.S. Lazio players
ACF Fiorentina players
Palermo F.C. players
FC Lugano players
Expatriate footballers in Switzerland
A.S.G. Nocerina players
Leyton Orient F.C. managers
English Football League managers
Italian football managers
Expatriate football managers in England
Italian expatriate football managers
Association football midfielders
Serie A managers
Serie B managers
Serie C managers
U.S. Lecce managers
Parma Calcio 1913 managers
Ternana Calcio managers
Cagliari Calcio managers